Winterland is a posthumous live box set by the Jimi Hendrix Experience. Released on September 13, 2011, by Experience Hendrix and Legacy Recordings, the four-disc collection documents the band's six performances at the Winterland Ballroom in San Francisco, California between October 10 and 12, 1968. A single disc "highlights" edition was released the same day. 

On August 23, 2011, "Like a Rolling Stone" was released as a single, backed with "Spanish Castle Magic".  Several of recordings that are included on the box set had been previously released on The Jimi Hendrix Concerts (1982) and Live at Winterland (1987). The Amazon.com exclusive disc five was recorded at the Fillmore Auditorium in San Francisco on February 4, 1968 and was previously released on Paris 1967/San Francisco 1968 (2003).

Track listing
Details taken from the original Experience Hendrix box set notes; other sources may show different information.

Personnel
 Jimi Hendrix – vocals, guitar
 Noel Redding – bass guitar, backing vocals
 Mitch Mitchell – drums
 Jack Casady – bass on "Killing Floor" and "Hey Joe" (October 10)
 Virgil Gonsalves – flute on "Are You Experienced?" (October 11)
 Herbie Rich – organ (five songs, October 11)
Exclusive disc five (Fillmore, February 4, 1968)
 Jimi Hendrixguitar, vocals
 Mitch Mitchelldrums
 Noel Reddingbass guitar
 Buddy Milesdrums on "Dear Mr. Fantasy Part 1 & 2"

References

2011 live albums
Live albums published posthumously
Jimi Hendrix live albums
Legacy Recordings live albums